3Q or 3-Q may refer to:

 3Q, IATA airline code for China Yunnan Airlines
 The third quarter of a fiscal year
 The third quarter of a calendar year
3Q, designation for one of the Qumran Caves
3q, an arm of Chromosome 3 (human)
 3Q, eye dialect in Chinese and Japanese meaning "thank you"

See also
Q3 (disambiguation)